Niezabyszewo  (German: Damsdorf) is a village in the administrative district of Gmina Bytów, within Bytów County, Pomeranian Voivodeship, in northern Poland.

The village has a population of 810.

Notable residents
 Albert von Memerty (1814–1896), Prussian general

References

Niezabyszewo